Triscaedecia svetlanae is a moth of the family Alucitidae. It was described by Petr Ustjuzhanin, Vasiliy Kovtunovich and Donald Hobern in 2019. It is found in West Pahang, Malaysia.

References

Moths described in 2019
Alucitidae